The Andalite's Gift is the first book in the  series, a set of companion books to the Animorphs series. With respect to continuity, it takes place between Book #7: The Stranger and Book #8: The Alien. The Andalite's Gift was originally published as two parts and later put together as one book as #2 of Megamorphs came out.

The  books are narrated by all six members of the Animorphs, in turns, but there is no specific order, unlike the order of narration in the regular series. This is the first Animorphs book to feature narration by more than a single character. This is also the first book where Ax narrates, predating any of his own books. While each chapter header in  includes a small icon showing the face of the chapter's narrator, Ax's chapters have no icon; he also does not appear on the front cover, or in the illustration. Ax's physical appearance would not be depicted until his first book, The Alien.

Plot summary

The Animorphs plan to have a lazy summer, with several Animorphs attending a pool party and Rachel going to a gymnastics camp. However, before she can leave for the camp, Rachel - in her eagle morph - takes a cruise through the air and, seeing Ax, attempts to say hello but is mobbed by smaller birds, who cause her to crash and lose consciousness. When she awakens, she has demorphed to human but has amnesia.

Meanwhile, Jake and Cassie are attending the pool party. Because Marco was not invited, he decides to take Ax along. The two of them morph into mice and crash the party. After they are done terrorizing the guests, they run into the basement to demorph. However, when they demorph, they are attacked by a massive flying monster, known as a Veleek (Yeerk word for "pet"). It destroys the house before abruptly dissolving into dust and leaving. The Animorphs regroup and discover that Rachel never made it to the gymnastics camp. Jake, Marco, and Tobias head into the forest to look for her. As Jake and Marco morph to wolves, the Veleek begins to chase after them, and they realize that the Veleek is drawn by the energy generated through morphing. Moments before they are about to collapse from exhaustion, the Veleek flies away.

Rachel has been captured by a crazy ex-Controller, who locks her in a wooden shack and sets fire to it. Rachel inadvertently morphs into a grizzly bear to escape, and is then attacked by the Veleek. The two begin to fight, until Ax encounters them mid-combat. He begins to morph and the Veleek captures him and returns to the Blade ship, delivering Ax to Visser Three. Rachel demorphs and makes her way into town, where she hides out in an empty house. When police surround the house and tell her to come out, she morphs into an elephant and breaks through the side of the house.

Meanwhile, Jake, Marco and Cassie notice the Veleek floating through the air as dust, and steal Cassie's father's truck in order to chase after it. They attempt to play a game of "keepaway", by continually morphing to distract the Veleek, but their plan does not succeed. The truck crashes into Rachel's elephant form, restoring her memory but drawing the Veleek to all four Animorphs. The Veleek attempts to capture Rachel, but cannot lift her. Jake and Marco continue on in the truck, but crash it again, and Marco is captured by the Veleek.

Marco and Ax, now prisoners of Visser Three, are on board the Blade Ship. Ax morphs into a flea and hides on the Visser's body. He slightly demorphs and remorphs to attract the attention of the Veleek. The Veleek begins to attack Visser Three, causing Visser Three to order the water turned on. In the confusion, Ax and Marco escape from the Blade Ship, morphing into birds moments before they hit the ground. From this event, the Animorphs realize that the Veleek does not like water.

The next day, Cassie develops a plan in which they hope to stop the Veleek: the Animorphs head out to sea, where Cassie finds and acquires a humpback whale. She morphs into a cockroach, and Tobias flies her as high up as he can. While the remaining Animorphs morph and demorph dolphins to keep the Veleek distracted, Cassie demorphs and then morphs into the whale, all the time falling back to the sea. The Veleek attempts to capture her but cannot carry the whale's weight, and it is dragged into the sea and drowns.

Morphs

Trivia
The summary on the back cover is narrated by Jake.

TV adaptation
The Andalite's Gift was adapted as part of the Animorphs TV series, which aired on Nickelodeon and YTV between the fall of 1998 and the spring of 2000. The first <Megamorphs> book was covered by the thirteenth episode, "The Forgotten", which is the name of the eleventh book in the series (the TV episode bears no resemblance to its namesake book). The TV episodes did not follow the books faithfully, altering many aspects of the characters' roles within the Animorphs, the events in the war against the Yeerks, and added plot lines that were not present in the books. The Veleek and its associated plot line are not present in the TV episode.

Animorphs books
1997 science fiction novels
1997 American novels
Fiction about amnesia
Novels with multiple narrators